Nicholas Strange may refer to:

 Nicholas Strange (MP)
Nicholas Strange (rower)